James Heygate, a Glaswegian, was an Anglican bishop in Ireland during the first half of the Seventeenth century.

Formerly Archdeacon of Clogher, he was consecrated Bishop of Kilfenora on 30 May 1630; and served until his death on 30 April 1638.

Notes

Archdeacons of Clogher
Bishops of Kilfenora (Church of Ireland)
1638 deaths
Clergy from Glasgow